Regobarrosia pseudoflavescens is a moth in the family Erebidae. It was described by Walter Rothschild in 1910. It is found in the Brazilian state of Minas Gerais.

References

Moths described in 1910
Phaegopterina